The 1898 United States elections occurred in the middle of Republican President William McKinley's first term, during the Fourth Party System. The elections took place shortly after the Spanish–American War. Members of the 56th United States Congress were chosen in this election. Republicans retained control of both houses of Congress.

Democrats picked up several seats in the House at the expense of Republicans and the Populist Party. However, Republicans continued to control the chamber with a slightly diminished majority.

In the Senate, Republicans picked up several seats at the expense of the Democrats, growing the Republican majority. Several Senators continued to affiliate with third parties.

The elections helped Democrats further incorporate the remaining elements of the Populist Party, many of whom had been attracted to the Democratic Party after the 1896 candidacy of William Jennings Bryan. Republican Senate gains helped ensure ratification of the Treaty of Paris, which ended the Spanish–American War and left the US in control of Cuba, the Philippines, Guam, and Puerto Rico.

See also
 1898 United States House of Representatives elections
 1898–99 United States Senate elections
1898 United States gubernatorial elections

References

 
1898
United States midterm elections